Marcel Fischer (born 14 August 1978, in Biel/Bienne) is a Swiss fencer who competed in the Men's Épée Individual at the 2004 Summer Olympics and won the gold medal. He finished 4th at the 2000 Olympics.

His achievements earned him the 2004 Swiss Award in sports.

References

1978 births
Living people
People from Biel/Bienne
Swiss male épée fencers
Olympic gold medalists for Switzerland
Olympic fencers of Switzerland
Fencers at the 2000 Summer Olympics
Fencers at the 2004 Summer Olympics
Olympic medalists in fencing
Medalists at the 2004 Summer Olympics
Universiade medalists in fencing
Universiade bronze medalists for Switzerland
Medalists at the 1999 Summer Universiade
Medalists at the 2005 Summer Universiade
Sportspeople from the canton of Bern